Summa Technologiae (the title is in Latin, meaning "Summa (Compendium) of Technology" in English) is a 1964 book by Polish author Stanisław Lem. Summa is one of the first collections of philosophical essays by Lem. The book exhibits depth of insight and irony usual for Lem's creations. The name is an allusion to Summa Theologiae by Thomas Aquinas.

Description
Paraphrasing the author, the book tries to "examine the thorns of roses that have not flowered yet"—in other words, to deal with problems of the remote (and in some cases, not so remote) future. The primary question Lem treats in the book is that of civilization in the absence of limitations, both technological and material. He also looks at moral-ethical and philosophical consequences of future technologies.

Despite its age and a number of inaccuracies in specific domains (e.g., mathematics, biology, sociology), the book has lost no momentum in the past years.  Among the themes that Lem discusses in the book and that were completely in the realm of science fiction then, but are gaining importance today, are virtual reality (Lem calls it "phantomatics"), theory of search engines ("ariadnology", after Ariadne's thread), technological singularity, molecular nanotechnology ("molectronics"), cognitive enhancement  ("cerebromatics"),  artificial intelligence ("intellectronics"). 

In the preface to the first edition Lem mentions the crucial role of Iosif Shklovsky's popular science monograph Вселенная, жизнь, разум (Moscow, USSR Academy of Sciences Publisher, 1962) in shaping Lem's Summae.

In 1996 the book received the award of the Czech  Academy of Science Fiction, Fantasy and Horror (Akademie science fiction, fantasy a hororu) in the category "Nonfiction titles" ("Titul mimo beletrii").

Contents
The book has eight chapters, each dealing with far-fetched implications of a certain concept:

 1. Dilemmas
 Lem starts by presenting his views on future prognostication and motivations in writing the book.
 2. Two Evolutions
 This chapter considers similarities between several evolutions: biological, technological and social.
 3. Space Civilizations
 An overview of contemporary (to the book) SETI efforts and theories is given, with their criticism. 
 4. Intellectronics 
 A word coined by Lem to speculate on the field that is known today as artificial intelligence: The day will come when machine intelligence will rival or surpass the human one. Moreover, problems facing humankind may surpass the intellectual abilities of flesh and blood researchers. What shall we expect (or fear) in this conception of the future?
 5. Prolegomena to Omnipotence
 Technological evolution gives us more and more abilities—in fact, sometime in the future we should be able to do everything at all! Or maybe not?

 6. Phantomology
 Another term invented by Lem for what is known now as virtual reality. Human perception is limited by biology—so maybe we can bypass the real omnipotence in favor of an imitated one? Even in this case, Lem finds many surprising problems. 
Lem revisited this section in 1991 in his essay "Thirty Years Later", translated in the book A Stanislaw Lem Reader. Many the predictions from this section are coming to reality.
 7. Creation of the Worlds
 May it be that instead of painstaking research we can "grow" new information from available information in an automatic way? Starting with this question Lem evolves the concept to the creation of whole new Universes, including (as a special treat) the construction of a heaven/hell/afterlife enabled one.
 8. Pasquinade on Evolution
 Biological evolution did a rather lousy job designing humans and other animals. Can engineers do better?

The first edition also contained:
9 Art and Technology 
 (.) After Leszek Kołakowski severely criticised the chapter, it was removed in later editions, both Polish and foreign. In 1988 Lem remarked that during the time past the subject had gained it its actuality.

The 4th, expanded edition (1984) contains an additional essay:
 Afterword. 20 Years Later.

In 1991 Lem wrote a yet another afterword, Thirty Years Later, published separately and translated in A Stanislaw Lem Reader.

Translations 
The book was originally published in Polish.
Czech:   Transl. Pavel Weigel.
Chinese:  Transl. Yunjiang Hongmeng(云将鸿蒙), Yunjiang Hongmeng Er Hao Ji(云将鸿蒙二号机) and Mao Rui(毛蕊).
English: 
, first complete English translation; translated by Joanna Zylinska
Chapter I "Dilemmas" and fragments of chapters II "Two Evolutions", IV "Intellectronics" and VI "Pasquil on the Evolution" had earlier been translated by Frank Prengel.
German: Lem, Stanisław. Summa Technologiae,  Transl. Friedrich Griese, Frankfurt, Insel Verlag, 1976, 
Hungarian: Summa technologiae. Tudomány, civilizáció, jövő; translated by Radó György; Kossuth, Budapest, 1972 (Univerzum könyvtár)
Latvian: Summa technologiae, tulk. un pēcv. aut. Juris Birzvalks, Rīga, 1987, izd. "Apvārsnis", tip. "Cīņa".
Russian: 
First translation (from the 2nd Polish edition): Лем, Станислав. Сумма технологии = Summa Technologiae / пер. с польск. А. Г. Громовой, Д. И. Иорданского, Р. И. Нудельмана, Б. Н. Пановкина, Л. Р. Плинера, Р. А. Трофимова, Ю. А. Ярошевского; introduction by В. В. Парина; editing and afterword by Б. В. Бирюкова и Ф. В. Широкова. Moscow, Mir Publishers, 1968, 608 pp.
First full translation, without censorship: in: Лем, Станислав. Собрание сочинений, 10 vols. Moscow, Tekst, 1996. Vol. 13 (extra) : Сумма технологии.
Serbo-Croatian: ; translated by Petar Vujičić
Spanish: Lem, Stanisław. Summa Technologiae, Transl. Bárbara Gill, Buenos Aires, Ediciones Godot, 2017,

See also
Science Fiction and Futurology, another Lem book on the topic.

References

External links 
 
 Lem's short description of the book, in English
 The rise of data and the death of politics (2014-07-19), Evgeny Morozov, The Guardian.  

1964 non-fiction books
Essay collections
Futurology books
Works by Stanisław Lem
Polish non-fiction books